Roman Ilnytskyi (born 30 January 1998) is a professional Ukrainian football midfielder who plays for Polissya Zhytomyr in the Ukrainian Second League.

Ilnytskyi is a product of the FC Volyn Youth Sportive School System. Then he signed a professional contract with  FC Volyn Lutsk in the Ukrainian Premier League.

He made his debut in the Ukrainian Premier League for FC Volyn on 16 April 2017, played in the winning match against FC Zirka Kropyvnytskyi.

References

External links
Profile at Official FFU Site (Ukr)

Living people
1998 births
Ukrainian footballers
Association football midfielders
Ukrainian Premier League players
FC Volyn Lutsk players